Sopron Basket is a Hungarian women's basketball club from Sopron. Founded in 1921 as the women's section of Soproni VSE, it has played in the Hungarian National Championship since 1986. It plays its home games in the Aréna Sopron.

Sopron won its first national championship in 1993, making its debut in the Euroleague the following season. Settled in the top positions, the team played in subsequent years the Ronchetti Cup, which it won in 1998 beating ASPTT Aix-en-Provence. As of 2011 Sopron remains the only Hungarian women's basketball team that has won an international competition since the fall of communism. The following year Sopron won its second championship, which marked its return to the Euroleague, which it has played every year since.

The team has won four more championships since 2002, three of them between 2007 and 2011. In 2009 it reached the Euroleague's Final Four after beating Wisła Kraków and Bourges Basket in the knockout stages, ending 4th after losing to CB Avenida and UMMC Ekaterinburg. Sopron won its first-ever EuroLeague championship in 2022.

Honours

Titles
 1 EuroLeague Women (2021–22)
 1 Ronchetti Cup (1998)
 15 Hungarian Leagues (1993, 1999, 2002, 2007, 2008, 2009, 2011, 2013, 2015, 2016, 2017, 2018, 2019, 2021, 2022)
 10 Hungarian Cups (2007, 2008, 2011, 2012, 2013, 2015, 2017, 2019, 2020, 2021)

Record in European competitions
 EuroLeague
 1994: 1st Preliminary Round
 2000: Quarter-Finals
 2001: Quarter-Finals
 2002: Quarter-Finals
 2003: Quarter-Finals
 2004: Round of 16
 2005: Round of 16
 2006: Quarter-Finals
 2007: Quarter-Finals
 2008: Round of 16
 2009: 4th
 2010: Group Stage (4/6)
 2011: Round of 16
 2012: Group Stage (4/8)
 2013: Group Stage (3/9)
 2014: Round of 16
 2016: Group Stage (1/13)
 2017: Group Stage (4/10)
 2018: Runners-up
 2019: 4th
 2020: Group Stage (6/8)
 2021: 4th
 2022: Champion
 Ronchetti Cup
 1995: Group Stage (4/4)
 1996: 3rd Preliminary Round
 1997: Quarter-Finals
 1998: Champion
 1999: Quarter-Finals

Current squad

Team roster
Roster for the 2017–18 season
 Guards
 [1.78]  Virág Weninger
 [1.71]  Yvonne Turner
 [1.78]  Zsófia Fegyverneky
 [1.84]  Debora Dubei
 [1.78]  Ángela Salvadores
 Forwards
 [1.88]  Aleksandra Crvendakić
 [1.83]  Dalma Czukor
 [1.91]  Tina Jovanović
 [1.68]  Dominika Böröndy
 [1.90]  Jelena Milovanović
 [1.90]  Patrícia Bakó
 Centers
 [1.93]  Alaina Denise Coates
 [2.10]  Bernadett Határ
 [1.88]  Danielle Page

Technical staff
  Head Coach: Roberto Íñiguez
  Assistant Coach: Carlos Cantero
  Fitness Coach: Alberto Pacheco
  Physiotherapist: Angel Lopez
  Team Doctor: György Sztancs, MD

References

External links
 
 Profile at eurobasket.com

Women's basketball teams in Hungary
EuroLeague Women clubs
Sport in Sopron
Basketball teams established in 1921